Dalang Arena is an indoor sporting arena located in Dalang, Dongguan, Guangdong, China. The capacity of the arena is 4,000 spectators and opened in 1994. It hosts indoor sporting events such as basketball and volleyball and is home to the Shenzhen Leopards who play in the Chinese Basketball Association.

See also 
 Chinese Basketball Association
 Dongguan Arena
 Shenzhen Leopards

References 

Indoor arenas in China
Sports venues in Guangdong
Guangdong Vermilion Birds